The League of European Research Universities (LERU) is a consortium of European research universities.

History and overview
The League of European Research Universities (LERU) is an association of research-intensive universities. Founded in 2002, as a partnership among twelve multi-faculty research universities, in 2017 it expanded its membership to twenty-three. As the latest additions, Trinity College Dublin and the University of Copenhagen joined the alliance on 1 January 2017. The purpose of the League is to influence policy in Europe and to develop best practice through mutual exchange of experience. LERU regularly publishes a variety of papers and reports which make high-level policy statements, provide analyses and make recommendations for policymakers, universities, researchers and other stakeholders.

LERU is headquartered in Leuven, Belgium. Prof. dr. Kurt Deketelaere is the current Secretary-General. Prof. Yves Flückiger is the current Chair.

Membership

The 23 member universities as of 2017 are:

 KU Leuven

 University of Copenhagen

 University of Helsinki

 Sorbonne University
 Paris-Saclay University
 University of Strasbourg

 University of Freiburg
 Heidelberg University
 University of Munich

 Trinity College Dublin

 University of Milan

 University of Amsterdam 
 Leiden University
 Utrecht University

 University of Barcelona

 Lund University

 University of Geneva
 University of Zurich

 Imperial College London
 University College London (UCL)
 University of Cambridge
 University of Edinburgh
 University of Oxford

Former members 

 Karolinska Institutet

See also
List of higher education associations and alliances
Association of East Asian Research Universities

Notes
 These universities also belong to the Coimbra Group, a (larger) alliance of European universities.
 These universities also belong to Europaeum, another European university network.
 These universities joined the League as new members on January 1, 2006.
 These universities also belong to the Utrecht Network, another European university network.
  These universities joined the League as new members on January 1, 2010.
 These universities joined the League as new members on January 1, 2017.

References

External links

College and university associations and consortia in Europe